Kudinov is a surname that may refer to:

 Dimitri Kudinov (born 1963), Georgian football player
 Dmitri Kudinov (footballer, born 1971), Russian football player
 Dmitri Kudinov (footballer, born 1985), Russian football player
 Vasily Kudinov (born 1969), Russian handball player
 Yuri Kudinov (born 1979), Russian swimmer

Russian-language surnames